Dalkhan (also Romanized as Dalkhān; also known as Shūl-e Dalkhān and Talakhān) is a village in Shesh Pir Rural District, Hamaijan District, Sepidan County, Fars Province, Iran. At the 2006 census, its population was 1,231, in 233 families.

References 

Populated places in Sepidan County